Jim Plumer is an American ice hockey coach. He is the current head coach of the Vermont Catamounts women's ice hockey team. He previously served as the women's hockey head coach at Amherst, where he guided them to back-to-back NCAA Division III national championships.

Coaching career
As a student at Colby College, Plumer helped the men's hockey team during the 1983-84 season. Upon graduation, he moved on to become the women's hockey head coach at North Yarmouth Academy in Maine. A Master Level coach with USA Hockey, Plumer has coached at various showcase and camps across the region, and in 2000 was named a women's hockey assistantcoach at Bowdoin College where he was on the staff of two of the Polar Bears' NCAA Division III Final Four appearances and the 2001-02 NESCAC women's hockey championship team.

In 2003, Plumer was named the women's hockey head coach at Amherst, where he guided the team to five 20-plus win seasons, three league titles, and an unbeaten streak in NESCAC play that stretched from 2006 to 2010. In that time, Amherst won the 2009 and 2010 NCAA Division III Women's Hockey Championships, becoming the first program in Amherst history to win multiple national titles. Plumer was twice named NESCAC Coach of the Year, as well. After nine seasons and a 127-30-14 record in his final six seasons, Plumer was named the third coach in Vermont women's hockey Division I history, replacing Tim Bothwell.

Under Plumer's guidance, the Catamounts qualified for its first ever Hockey East tournament appearance in 2013. The following season, the school set a program record for wins with 18, and won its first ever Hockey East Quarterfinal series. Plumer was named Hockey East Coach of the Year for his efforts.

College head coaching record

References

External links

Living people
People from Norwood, Massachusetts
Ice hockey coaches from Massachusetts
Vermont Catamounts women's ice hockey coaches
Year of birth missing (living people)
American ice hockey coaches